Ali Maher may refer to:
 Ali Mahir Pasha (1882–1960), former prime minister of Egypt
 Ali Maher (diplomat) (born 1939), Egyptian diplomat and intellectual figure
 Ali Maher (footballer) (born 1973), Egyptian football striker
 Ali Maher (artist/architect) (1958–2013), Jordanian artist